Bilal Maqsood (Urdu: بلال مقصود) is a Pakistani singer-songwriter, composer, music video director and painter better known for being a founding member of the pop-rock band Strings (1988–2021). 

With his Strings partner Faisal Kapadia he was the director and co-producer of Coke Studio Pakistan from 2014 to 2017 and has also directed a number of music videos for his band as well for other artists. 

In 2020 he became the director and executive producer of another musical show, Velo Sound Station, for its first season.

After the end of Strings in 2021 he has chosen a solo career that he launched in 2022.

Early life
Bilal Maqsood is the son of the popular writer, actor, artist, TV host and comedian Anwar Maqsood. His mother Imrana Maqsood is a novelist and playwright who has written children's books and cookbooks and is the recipient of numerous national awards.

He's an alumni of the Indus Valley School of Art and Architecture.

Music career

Strings (1988–2021)
For Bilal and his band Strings, formed in 1988, success came in 1992 after the launch of the song Sar Kiye Yeh Pahar, which was well received by the public. The quartet disbanded in 1992 so the members could concentrate on their studies and came back years later in 1999, with Bilal Maqsood and Faisal Kapadia now forming a duo even if other artists would complement them during the live performances. Generally, the band's music was composed by Bilal while the lyrics were penned by his father Anwar Maqsood.

Strings made its entry into the Bollywood music scene in 2006, when the band sung Yeh Hai Meri Kahani for the movie Zinda, the single topping the charts.

The band ended in 2021.

Solo career (2022–present)
After his departure from Strings following 33 years of activities, Bilal launched his solo music career with gigs in Karachi and Lahore.

In May 2022, he released his first solo single, Naya Naya, which he co-wrote with his father.

Later during the same year he released the album Urdu Nursery Rhymes, having written, sung and composed eight nursery rhymes so children could get closer to the Urdu language.

Painting
Before seriously pursuing a career in music he was a painter, having his paintings exhibited at the Pakistan American Cultural Center in Karachi while he was still a student at the Indus Valley School of Art & Architecture.

Since the end of Strings he's spending time on painting again, involving his son Mikael Maqsood in the process as well.

Discography

Solo studio albums
 Urdu Nursery Rhymes (2022)

Solo singles and EPs
 Naya Naya (2022)
 Zalima (2022)
 Thak Sa Gaya Hoon (2022)

Videography
 Sar Kiye Yeh Pahaar (début video of his band Strings)
 Maula (the last video shot by Vital Signs)
 Us Rah Par (featuring Junaid Jamshed)
 Beirut (Strings)

Gallery

See also
 Strings

References

External links
 Strings band – Official website
 

1971 births
Living people
Pakistani male singer-songwriters
Pakistani guitarists
Pakistani pop singers
Pakistani music video directors
Pakistani painters
Indus Valley School of Art and Architecture alumni
Strings (band) members
Artists from Karachi
Musicians from Karachi
Pakistani heavy metal guitarists
Muhajir people
Pakistani people of Hyderabadi descent
Bilal
B. V. S. Parsi High School alumni